Sankarankutty Kunjiraman Pottekkatt (14 March 1913 – 6 August 1982) was an Indian writer of Malayalam literature and a politician from Kerala, India. He was also a great traveller among the Keralites, who wrote many travelogues for the people who have been unintroduced to the outside world. He was the author of nearly sixty books which include ten novels, twenty-four collections of short stories, three anthologies of poems, eighteen travelogues, four plays, a collection of essays and a couple of books based on personal reminiscences. He is a recipient of Kerala Sahitya Akademi Award for Novel, Sahitya Akademi Award and the Jnanpith Award. His works have been translated into English, Italian, Russian, German and Czech, besides all major Indian languages.

Biography

S. K. Pottekkatt was born on March 14, 1913, in Thiyya family Calicut (Kozhikode) to Kunjiraman Pottekkat, an English school teacher and his wife, Kittuli. After early schooling at Ganapath School, he matriculated from Zamorin's High School in Calicut in 1929 and passed the intermediate examination from Zamorin's Guruvayurappan College, Calicut in 1934 but could not find a job for three years, a period which he utilised for studying classics from Indian and western literature. In 1937, he joined Calicut Gujarati School as a teacher where he taught for almost three years. He was involved with activities of the Indian National Congress and attended the Tripuri session of 1939 for which he resigned from the job as the school authorities did not allow him to leave of absence. Subsequently, he moved to Bombay and Lucknow where he stayed until 1945, doing many jobs. After returning to Kerala in 1945, he travelled to many parts of India and went on his first overseas tour in 1949 when he visited Africa, Switzerland, Italy, Germany, France and England. In 1952, he again went overseas to visit Ceylon, Malaya, and Indonesia.

Pottekkatt married Jayavalli in 1950 and the couple had two sons and two daughters. His wife died in 1980 and two years later, he suffered a paralytic stroke in July 1982, and he died on August 6, 1982, in a private hospital in Calicut.

Literary career and travels

Pottekkatt published his first story, "Rajaneethi", in the college magazine of Zamorin's Guruvayurappan College in 1928. "Makane Konna Madyam" (poem published in Athmavidya Kahalam) and "Hindu Muslim Maithri" (story published in Deepam) were some of his notable early works. The story "Vydyutha Shakthi" came in the February 1934 issue of Mathrubhumi Illustrated Weekly. He wrote his first novel, Naadanpremam, a romantic story set in Mukkam, a small hamlet in Kozhikode district, in 1939 while he was in Bombay and the novel was eventually published in 1941. This was followed by Yavanikakku Pinnil, a short story anthology, and the second novel Vishakanyaka; the latter would receive a prize from the Madras government in 1949. Two travelogues were the next two publications, Kappirikalude Naattil (In the Land of the Negroes) and Innathe Europe (The Europe Today), both based on his first overseas tour. He published Oru Theruvinte Katha in 1960 and his magnum opus, Oru Desathinte Katha, in 1971.

Pottekkatt was a writer of strong social commitment and ideals, possessing an individualistic vision. He is reported to be the pioneer of the genre of travelogues in India and its most notable practitioner in Malayalam literature which earned him the moniker, the John Gunther of Malayalam. Poetry anthologies like Sanchariyude Geethangal and Premashilpi, Achan (play), novels like Premashiksha and Moodupadam, short story anthologies such as Nishagandhi, Pulliman and Chandrakatham, travelogues viz. Simhabhoomi, Nile Diary and Pathira Sooryante Nattil as well as memoirs like Ponthakkadukal and Samsarikkunna Diarykurippukal are some of his other major works. His works have been translated into English, Italian, Russian, German and Czech, besides all major Indian languages. An Italian anthology of The Best Short Stories of the World published from Milan in 1971 included his Braanthan Naaya (Mad Dog). A collection of eleven of his short stories in Russian had a sensational sales of one hundred thousand copies in two weeks. His stories have made into feature films in Malayalam; Naadan Premam, Moodupadam, Pulliman and Njavalppazhangal are some of them. Kadavu, a 1991 film written directed by M. T. Vasudevan Nair based on his short story "Kadathuthoni", received prizes at several international film festivals. The 2015 film Manikyam was an adaptation of the novel Prema Shiksha.

Political career 

Pottekkatt contested  twice as independent candidate in elections to Indian Parliament from Thalassery under the banner of the Communist Party of India, the first in 1957 to the 2nd Lok Sabha when he lost to M. K. Jinachandran by 1000 votes and the next in 1962 to the 3rd Lok Sabha when he defeated Sukumar Azhikode by a margin of 66,000 votes; he served out his term until 1967.

Awards and honours
Oru Theruvinte Katha (The Story of a Street), a novel based on Mittai Theruvu, a popular street in Kozhikode known for sweetmeat and halvah stalls, received the Kerala Sahitya Akademi Award for Novel in 1961. His biographical novel, Oru Desathinte Katha was selected for the Sahitya Akademi Award in 1972. Eight years later, in 1980, the novel earned Pottekkatt the Jnanpith Award, the highest literary honour in India.  In 1982, the University of Calicut honoured him with the honoris causa degree of the Doctor of Letters. India Post issued a commemorative postal stamp on him in 2003, as a part of their Jnanpith Award Winners. Malayala Manorama and Madhyamam issued festschrifts on Pottekkatt on the occasion of his birth centenary.

Bibliography

Novels

Short stories

Travelogues

Poetry

Drama

Others

Translations into other languages 
 
 

Many works are translated to Tamil by Su Ra.

Films

 Moodupadam (1963) (based on the novel Moodupadam)
 Naadan Premam (1972) (based on the novel Naadan Premam)
 Pulliman (1972)  (based on the story "Pulliman")
 Njavalppazhangal (1976) (based on the story "Njavalppazhangal")
 Ottakam (1978) (based on the story "Ottakam")
 Thaala (1988)
 Kadavu (1991) (based on the story "Kadathuthoni")
 Manikyam (2015) (based on the novel Prema Shiksha)

References

Further reading

External links

 
 
 
 
 
 Ambikasuthan Mangad. Review of the famous story "Pulliman". ''Madhyamam Weekly.

1913 births
1982 deaths
Indian travel writers
Indian male novelists
Indian male short story writers
Indian diarists
Indian memoirists
Writers from Kozhikode
Malayalam-language writers
Malayalam novelists
Malayalam short story writers
Malayalam poets
Recipients of the Jnanpith Award
Recipients of the Sahitya Akademi Award in Malayalam
Recipients of the Kerala Sahitya Akademi Award
India MPs 1962–1967
20th-century Indian novelists
20th-century Indian poets
Indian male poets
Lok Sabha members from Kerala
Politicians from Kozhikode
20th-century Indian short story writers
20th-century Indian dramatists and playwrights
Indian male dramatists and playwrights
Novelists from Kerala
Poets from Kerala
20th-century Indian essayists
Journalists from Kerala
Dramatists and playwrights from Kerala
20th-century Indian male writers
20th-century memoirists
20th-century diarists